Sargocentron spiniferum, common name sabre squirrelfish, giant squirrelfish and spiny squirrelfish, is a large Indo-Pacific species of squirrelfish belonging to the family Holocentridae.

Description
The body is oval and laterally compressed. The head has a pointed snout and large eyes, being largely nocturnal. The basic colour is bright red. It has silver scale margins, a spinous dorsal fin and a large deep red patch just behind the eyes. The lower jaw protrudes beyond the upper jaw. It bears a very long preopercle spine (near the gill-opening). The anal and ventral fins are yellowish. The caudal fin is clearly bifid.

Distribution
This species is widespread throughout the tropical Indo-Pacific, from the Red Sea and Indian Ocean up to Hawaii, Japan and southern Australia.

Habitat

References

 Allen, Gerry. 1999. Marine Fishes of Tropical Australia and south-east Asia. 
 Debelius, Helmut. 1993. Indian Ocean Tropical Fish Guide.

External links
 Australian Museum
 Doris
 

spiniferum
Fish of Palau
Fish described in 1775
Taxa named by Peter Forsskål